Willi Nemitz (1 November 1910 – 11 April 1943) was a former Luftwaffe fighter ace and recipient of the Knight's Cross of the Iron Cross during World War II. The Knight's Cross of the Iron Cross was awarded to recognise extreme battlefield bravery or successful military leadership. Willi Nemitz was one of the oldest operational fighter pilots. His first known Soviet victory, was a LaGG-3 on 22 June 1942. Willi Nemitz was credited with 81 victories in about 500 missions. All his victories were recorded over the Eastern Front and includes at least 11 Il-2 Sturmoviks.

Career
Nemitz was born on 1 November 1910 in Greifenhagen in Pomerania, at the time in the Province of Pomerania, a province of the Kingdom of Prussia within the German Empire, present-day Gryfino in northwestern Poland. Following flight training, he was posted to 5. Staffel (5th squadron) of Jagdgeschwader 52 (JG 52—52nd Fighter Wing) in 1940. The Staffel was commanded by Oberleutnant August-Wilhelm Schumann and subordinated to II. Gruppe of JG 52 which was headed by Hauptmann Wilhelm Ensslen and fought in the Battle of Britain. On 2 November, Ensslen was killed in action and replaced by Hauptmann Erich Woitke.

Operation Barbarossa
In preparation of Operation Barbarossa, the German invasion of the Soviet Union, II. Gruppe of JG 52, without a period of replenishment in Germany, was ordered to airfields close to the German-Soviet demarcation line. While the Gruppenstab (group headquarters unit) and 4. Staffel were based at Suwałki in northeastern Poland, 5. and 6. Staffel were transferred to a forward airfield at Sobolewo. For the invasion, II. Gruppe of JG 52 was subordinated to the Geschwaderstab (headquarters unit) of Jagdgeschwader 27 (JG 27—27th Fighter Wing). The Geschwader was part of the VIII. Fliegerkorps commanded by Generaloberst Wolfram Freiherr von Richthofen which supported the northern wing of Army Group Centre.

On 22 June, the German forces launched the attack on the Soviet Union which opened the Eastern Front. On 25 June, the Gruppe moved to an airfield at Varėna in Lithuania which had previously been occupied by the Soviet Air Forces (VVS—Voyenno-Vozdushnye Sily). Two days later, the Gruppe moved to Maladzyechna, supporting the advance Panzergruppe 3 near Barysaw. Flying from this airfield, Nemitz claimed his first aerial victories, two Ilyushin DB-3 bombers shot down on 3 July. The next day, II. Gruppe moved to Sloboda, east of Minsk, before moving to an airfield named Lepel-West at Lyepyel on 5 July. From this airfield, II. Gruppe flew combat air patrols and fighter escort missions to combat areas near Vitebsk and Haradok, supporting Panzergruppe 2 and 3 in their advance to Vitebsk and Polotsk. On 12 July, the Gruppe moved to Kamary, an airfield in the western parts of Vitebsk. Ten day later on 22 July, II. Gruppe advanced to the airfield Andrejewka near Smolensk where it stayed until 5 August. Operating from Andrejewka, Nemitz shot down a Petlyakov Pe-2 bomber on 23 July, a DB-3 and Tupolev SB bomber on 26 July and another DB-3 bomber on 27 July.

II. Here, the Gruppe supported the fighting south of Lake Ilmen, and the German attacks on Shlisselburg, Leningrad and the Soviet fleet at Kronstadt. Operating from Soltsy, Nemitz claimed an I-18 fighter, referring to the  Mikoyan-Gurevich MiG-1 fighter, shot down on 18 August near Chudovo. On 24 August, II. Gruppe was ordered to an airfield at Spasskaya Polist on the river Polist, south of Chudovo and north of Novgorod on Lake Ilmen, supporting the 18th Army in its advance towards the Neva and Lake Ladoga. Here on 30 August, Nemitz shot down another I-18 fighter. Since German forces had reached the proximity of Leningrad, II. The Gruppe stayed at Lyuban until 30 September, flying missions to Shlisselburg, Leningrad and Mga. Fighting in this combat area, Nemitz claimed two aerial victories in September 1941. On 13 September, he was credited with the destruction of an DB-3 bomber, followed by an Ilyushin Il-2 ground attack aircraft on 23 September.

On 2 October, German forces launched Operation Typhoon, the failed strategic offensive to capture Moscow. In support of this offensive, II. Gruppe was moved to Stabna, located just north of Smolensk. On 5 October, Nemitz claimed a Pe-2 bomber shot down. On 4 November, II. Gruppe had moved to Ruza. Here, Nemitz claimed his last aerial victories of 1941 when on 14 November he was credited with the destruction of two I-18 fighters, taking his total to 13 aerial victories.

Eastern Front
In late January 1942, II. Gruppe was withdrawn from the Eastern Front and sent to Jesau near Königsberg for a period of recuperation and replenishment, arriving on 24 January 1942. In Jesau, the Gruppe received many factory new Bf 109 F-4 aircraft. On 14 April, II. Gruppe received orders to move to Pilsen, present-day Plzeň in the Czech Republic, for relocation to the Eastern Front. The Gruppe had also received a new commander, Woitke had been transferred and was replaced by Hauptmann Johannes Steinhoff. The Gruppe then moved to Wien-Schwechat on 24 April before flying to Zürichtal, present-day Solote Pole, a village near the urban settlement Kirovske in the Crimea. There, II. Gruppe participated in Operation Trappenjagd, a German counterattack during the Battle of the Kerch Peninsula, launched on 8 May. On 11 May, Nemitz claimed his first aerial victory of 1942 when he shot down a Polikarpov R-5 reconnaissance bomber aircraft.

On 16 May, II. Gruppe relocated to Artyomovsk, present-day Bakhmut where JG 52 supported the German forces fighting in the Second Battle of Kharkov. Operating from Artyomovsk, the Gruppe flew combat missions in the combat area of Izium, flying fighter escort for bombers from Kampfgeschwader 27 (KG 27—27th Bomber Wing) and Sturzkampfgeschwader 77 (StG 77—77th Dive Bomber Wing). On 19 May, Nemitz claimed a MiG-1 fighter shot down. Four days later, the Gruppe was ordered to relocate to Barvinkove where they stayed until 1 June. Flying from Barvinkove, Nemitz claimed an Il-2 ground-attack aircraft on 26 May and a MiG-1 fighter the next day.

Squadron leader and death
On 4 November 1942, Oberleutnant Siegfried Simsch, the Staffelkapitän (squadron leader) of 5. Staffel of JG 52, was severely injured in a flight accident. In consequence, Nemitz then briefly led the Staffel before Oberleutnant Gustav Denk officially took command in January 1943. On 10 February 1943, Hauptmann Rudolf Resch, the commander of 6. Staffel of JG 52, was transferred. In consequence, Denk was also transferred to take command of 6. Staffel. When Denk was killed in action on 13 February, Nemitz led 6. Staffel as well as 5. Staffel until Leutnant Helmut Haberda was given command. Nemitz was killed in action on 11 April in the area of Anapa. Command of 6. Staffel then transferred to Oberleutnant Karl Ritzenberger. Posthumously, Nemitz was promoted to Leutnant (second lieutenant).

Summary of career

Aerial victory claims
According to Spick, Nemitz was credited with 81 aerial victories claimed in over 500 combat missions. Mathews and Foreman, authors of Luftwaffe Aces — Biographies and Victory Claims, researched the German Federal Archives and found records for 82 aerial victory claims, plus one further unconfirmed claim. All of his confirmed aerial victories were claimed on the Eastern Front.

Victory claims were logged to a map-reference (PQ = Planquadrat), for example "PQ 7152". These sectors were then subdivided into 36 smaller units to give a location area 3 × 4 km in size.

Awards
 Honor Goblet of the Luftwaffe on 7 September 1942 as Feldwebel and pilot
 German Cross in Gold on 27 October 1942 as Feldwebel in the 5./Jagdgeschwader 52
 Knight's Cross of the Iron Cross on 24 March 1943 as Oberfeldwebel and pilot in the 4./Jagdgeschwader 52

Notes

References

Citations

Bibliography

 
 
 
 
 
 
 
 
 
 
 
 
 
 
 
 
 

1910 births
1943 deaths
Luftwaffe pilots
German World War II flying aces
Recipients of the Knight's Cross of the Iron Cross
Recipients of the Gold German Cross
Luftwaffe personnel killed in World War II
Aviators killed by being shot down
People from Gryfino County